Twrch Trwyth (also Trwyd, Troynt (MSS.HK); Troit (MSS.C1 D G Q); or Terit (MSS. C2 L)) is an enchanted wild boar in the Matter of Britain great story cycle that King Arthur or his men pursued with the aid of Arthur's dog Cavall.

The names of the hound and boar are glimpsed in a piece of geographical onomasticon composed in Latin in the ninth century, the Historia Brittonum. However, a richly elaborate account of the great hunt appears in the Welsh prose romance Culhwch and Olwen, probably written around 1100.  A passing reference to Twrch Trwyth also occurs in the elegy Gwarchan Cynfelyn preserved in the Book of Aneirin.

The name in Welsh can be construed to mean "the boar Trwyth", and may have its analogue in the boar Triath of Irish mythology (see #Etymology and Irish cognate below).

Historia Brittonum
The earliest reference to the boar Trwyth occurs in the tract De Mirabilibus Britanniae (or Mirabilia in shorthand), variously titled in English as "Wonders of Britain".  The Mirabilia is believed to be near-contemporaneous to Nennius' ninth-century Historia Brittonum and is found appended to it in many extant manuscripts.  It gives a list of marvels around Britain, one of them being the footprint left in rock by Arthur's dog Cavall (here Latinized as Cabal), made while chasing the great boar (here called Troynt):

Culhwch and Olwen
Twrch is named as the son of Prince Tared (or Taredd Wledig), cursed into the form of a wild creature; he has poisonous bristles, and carries a pair of scissors, a comb and a razor on his head between his ears. In French romances such as by Chrétien de Troyes, Ares is the father of a knight called Tor. Some scholars consider that Tor son of Ares is the Twrch son of Tared of Culhwch and Olwen and that the authentic name is probably Ares.

Culhwch is given the task by Ysbaddaden, the giant whose daughter Olwen Culhwch seeks, of obtaining the comb and scissors from Twrch's head. Later in the story it transpires there is also a razor secreted there. These implements are then to be used to cut and treat Ysbaddaden's hair (most of the tasks on the giant's long list are ultimately to do with this ceremony of hair-cutting). Further, Ysbaddaden states that the only hound who can hunt Twrch is Drudwyn, the whelp of Greid, and then goes on to list the requirements of the leash to hold Drudwyn, the only man strong enough to hold the leash. Ultimately Ysbaddaden calls on Culhwch to seek out Arthur, Culhwch's cousin, to help him hunt Twrch.

Prior to the hunt, Menw son of Teirgwaedd is sent to verify that the comb and scissors are between Twrch's ears. He takes the form of a bird and flies to Twrch's lair, encountering the boar with seven piglets. Menw then tries to swoop down and snatch one of the implements from Twrch's scalp, but only manages to take one silver bristle; Twrch is agitated and shakes himself, scattering venom onto Menw, wounding him.

The hunt for Twrch takes up the greater portion of the latter half of Culhwch and Olwen, and it is described in great detail: the geographical route of the pursuit, and those who take active part in it. Although it is Culhwch who is given the task, it is Arthur and his men who take the most prominent role in the chase, Culhwch having successfully enlisted his aid.

After causing the death of several of Arthur's troop, the boar surrenders the razor, scissors, and later the comb by force, and he is driven into the sea off Cornwall and drowned.

Yet another boar, Ysgithyrwyn or "White-Tusk, Chief of Boars", had to be captured for its tusk to complete the grooming of Ysbadadden.

Etymology and Irish cognate
As previously noted, the Welsh word twrch means "wild boar, hog, mole", so Twrch Trwyth means "the boar Trwyth". Its Irish cognate may be Triath, King of the Swine or the Torc Triath mentioned in Lebor Gabála Érenn, also recorded as Old Irish Orc tréith "Triath's boar" in Sanas Cormaic. Rachel Bromwich regards the form Trwyth as a late corruption. In the early text Historia Brittonum, the boar is called Troynt or Troit, a Latinisation likely from the Welsh Trwyd. Further evidence that Trwyd was the correct form appears in a reference in a later poem.

Popular culture
Twrch Trwyth is the name of a Welsh traditional dance group based in Clwb Ifor Bach, Cardiff.
Y Twrch Trwyth is also the mascot of Ysgol Dyffryn Aman (formally Amman Valley Comprehensive School and Amman Valley Grammar School) in Ammanford, Carmarthenshire, South West Wales.
 In the 2016 summer event of the mobile game Fate/Grand Order, Twrch Trwyth is the final boss.

See also
 Henwen, a sow from Cornwall that made a run from the south end to the north tip of Wales, and bore Cath Palug
 Ysgithyrwyn Chief Boar (Ysgithrwyn Pen Beidd, Yskithyrwynn Pennbeidd, "White-tusk chief of Boars")

Notes

References

(Texts of Culhwch)
(ed.,tr.) 
(Geraint ab Erbin (W).. p. 4 (E)..p. 67; Kilhwch ac Olwen (W).. p. 195 (E)..p. 249)
 (Revised edition 1993; Indexed 1989; first published Everyman Library 1949)
(Texts of the Mirabilia of Historia Brittonum)
(ed.) 
(ed.)  (Latin text of the "De Mirabilibus Britanniae", §73)
(ed., tr.)  
 (unable to identity author by his monogaram "R")
(Critical studies)

External links

 Reference to Historia Britonum and notes on the Hunt

Mythological pigs
Welsh mythology
Welsh legendary creatures
Arthurian characters
Pigs in literature